Aptos Creek is a southward flowing  creek that begins on Santa Rosalia Mountain on the southwestern slope of the Santa Cruz Mountains in Santa Cruz County, California and enters Monterey Bay, at Seacliff State Beach in Aptos, California.

History
The earliest record of "Outos" or "Aptos" is Arroyo de Outos in 1796, thought to be pronunciations of an Ohlone (Sp. Costanoan) village at the junction of Aptos and Valencia Creeks. Rancho de Aptos was a sheep ranch of Mission Santa Cruz shown on documents dating to July 5, 1807. Rancho Aptos was a  Mexican land grant in present-day Santa Cruz County, California, given in 1833  by Governor José Figueroa to Rafael Castro.

Watershed and course

Over 60% of the watershed of the Aptos Creek mainstem lies within and is protected by The Forest of Nisene Marks State Park. The major tributaries are (from top to bottom) Bridge Creek, Mangels Gulch, and then Valencia Creek (shortly after the latter receives its Trout Gulch tributary).

Ecology

The middle and upper watershed is in a second growth redwood (Sequoia sempervirens) forest that was clearcut over a forty-year period from 1883 to 1923. Coho salmon (Oncorhynchus kisutch) and steelhead trout (Oncorhynchus mykiss) in Central Coast streams are federally listed as endangered and threatened species, respectively.

See also
The Forest of Nisene Marks State Park
Rivers of California

References

External links
 The Nature Conservancy California Salmon Snapshots
 The Forest of Nisene Marks State Park website

Rivers of Santa Cruz County, California
Rivers of Northern California
Drainage basins of Monterey Bay